Rule-based machine learning (RBML) is a term in computer science intended to encompass any machine learning method that identifies, learns, or evolves 'rules' to store, manipulate or apply.  The defining characteristic of a rule-based machine learner is the identification and utilization of a set of relational rules that collectively represent the knowledge captured by the system.  This is in contrast to other machine learners that commonly identify a singular model that can be universally applied to any instance in order to make a prediction.

Rule-based machine learning approaches include learning classifier systems, association rule learning, artificial immune systems, and any other method that relies on a set of rules, each covering contextual knowledge.

While rule-based machine learning is conceptually a type of rule-based system, it is distinct from traditional rule-based systems, which are often hand-crafted, and other rule-based decision makers.  This is because rule-based machine learning applies some form of learning algorithm to automatically identify useful rules, rather than a human needing to apply prior domain knowledge to manually construct rules and curate a rule set.

Rules 
Rules typically take the form of an '{IF:THEN} expression', (e.g.  {IF 'condition' THEN 'result'}, or as a more specific example, {IF 'red' AND 'octagon' THEN 'stop-sign}).   An individual rule is not in itself a model, since the rule is only applicable when its condition is satisfied. Therefore rule-based machine learning methods typically comprise a set of rules, or knowledge base, that collectively make up the prediction model.

See also 

 Learning classifier system
 Association rule learning
 Associative classifier
 Artificial immune system
 Expert system
 Decision rule
 Rule induction
 Inductive logic programming
 Rule-based machine translation
 Genetic algorithm
 Rule-based system
 Rule-based programming
 RuleML
 Production rule system
 Business rule engine
 Business rule management system

References 

Machine learning algorithms